Regent Street is a street in London, England.

Regent Street may also refer to:

Regent Street, Cambridge, England
Regent Street, Nottingham, England
Regent Street (Wellington, Telford)
Regent Street, (Georgetown, Guyana)
Regent Street (Fredericton, New Brunswick)
Regent Street (North Sydney, Nova Scotia)
Regent Street (Richmond Hill, Ontario)
Regent Street (Sudbury, Ontario)
Regent Street (Port Chester, New York)
Regent Street (Schenectady, New York)
Regent Street (Madison, Wisconsin)
Regent Street (Philadelphia, Pennsylvania)
Regent Street, Singapore